Reggie Keith Ragland Jr. (born September 23, 1993) is an American football linebacker who is a free agent. He played college football at Alabama, winning two national championships.  He was then drafted by the Buffalo Bills in the second round of the 2016 NFL Draft. In 2016, he missed his rookie season after being placed on injured reserve with a torn ACL. During the 2017 season, he was traded to the Kansas City Chiefs for a fourth round pick in the 2019 draft. On January 6, 2018, Ragland started his first career playoff game, registering nine tackles during the team's 22-21 loss to the Tennessee Titans. Two years later he won his first Super Bowl, recording two tackles when the Chiefs defeated the San Francisco 49ers.

High school career 
A native of Huntsville, Alabama, Ragland started his high school career as an 8th grader, playing football at Grissom High School. Ragland's family relocated to Madison, Alabama, Ragland attended Bob Jones High School, where he was a varsity player in both football and basketball. As a sophomore, he played small forward on a basketball team that upset No. 1 Homewood to win the 2009–2010 AHSAA Class 6A Championship, with Levi Randolph being named MVP. Meanwhile, on the football field Ragland had 40 receptions as a tight end and six touchdowns. Mostly playing defense as a junior, he recorded 91 tackles in 2010 with 21 tackles-for-loss. Bob Jones went 8–4 over the season, losing 21–28 to Clay-Chalkville in the first round of the 6A playoffs. In his senior season, Ragland was credited with 97 tackles with 22 tackles-for-loss and six sacks. The Patriots allowed only 13 points per game and were 10–2 on the season, losing to the eventual 6A state runner-up Hoover in the second round of the playoffs. Ragland was also on the Patriots track & field team, where he competed in the discus throw and the shot put.

Regarded as a four-star recruit by Rivals.com, Ragland was listed as the No. 1 inside linebacker prospect in his class. Shortly after his junior season, he committed to Alabama over Auburn, Florida, and Tennessee.

College career 
As a true freshman on Alabama's 2012 championship team, Ragland played in 10 games, primarily on special teams, and was credited with eight tackles, include five solo stops, and a forced fumble. In his sophomore season, he appeared in 13 games, and compiled 17 tackles on the season as a back-up to C. J. Mosley. Both he and Reuben Foster were the leading candidates to replace Mosley at the “Will” linebacker spot in Alabama's 3–4 defense. Ragland eventually won out over Foster, starting all but one game for the Crimson Tide in 2014. He recorded 95 tackles on the season, which ranked second on the team behind only Landon Collins. Ragland also had 10.5 tackles for loss, 1.5 sacks, and a team-high three fumble recoveries. He was named SEC Defensive Player of the Week after a career-high 13 tackles against Louisiana State.

College statistics

Professional career
On January 21, 2016, it was announced that Ragland had accepted his invitation to play in the 2016 Senior Bowl. He impressed many scouts and analysts and was named one of the top performers during Senior Bowl practices. On January 26, 2016, he played outside linebacker for Jacksonville Jaguars' head coach Gus Bradley's South team that defeated the North 27-16. He was one of 38 collegiate linebackers that attended the NFL Scouting Combine in Indianapolis, Indiana. He completed the majority of drills, finishing fifth in the short shuttle and 14th in the 40-yard dash. Prior to the draft, however, medical exams revealed Ragland having an enlarged aorta. Although reports stated this would not affect his football career, several teams had lowered Ragland on their draft boards as a result. At the conclusion of the pre-draft process, Ragland was projected to be a first round pick by NFL draft experts and scouts. He was ranked the top inside linebacker prospect in the draft by NFLDraftScout.com, the second best linebacker by NFL analyst Mike Mayock, and was ranked the third best linebacker in the draft by Sports Illustrated and NFL analyst Charles Davis.

Buffalo Bills
The Buffalo Bills selected  Ragland in the second round (41st overall) of the 2016 NFL Draft. The Bills traded their second round pick (49th overall), a fourth round pick (117th overall), and their fourth round pick in the 2017 NFL Draft to the Chicago Bears for the 41st overall pick to draft him.

2016 season
On May 24, 2016, the Bills signed Ragland to a four-year, $5.84 million contract that includes $3.16 million guaranteed and a signing bonus of $2.44 million. Ragland and Preston Brown entered training camp slated as the starting inside linebackers for the Bills. On August 5, 2016, Ragland suffered an injury to the left knee during training camp. 

On August 30, 2016, Ragland was officially placed on injured reserve after it was discovered to be a torn ACL. He missed the entire rookie season due to the injury.

2017 season
Ragland entered training camp and competed against Preston Brown for the starting middle linebacker role in new defensive coordinator Leslie Frazier's 4-3 defense. On August 8, 2017, Ragland was demoted to the third team defense behind Brown and Tanner Vallejo.

Kansas City Chiefs
On August 28, 2017, Ragland was traded to the Kansas City Chiefs for a fourth round draft pick in the 2019 NFL Draft. The Bills had placed Ragland on the trade block for the majority of the summer as it was believed that he would not be an ideal fit for Bills' head coach Sean McDermott's base 4-3 defense. He was one of multiple players traded by the Bills after the arrival of new executives.

Head coach Andy Reid named Ragland the backup inside linebacker behind Ramik Wilson to start the regular season. Ragland was inactive for the first three games while he became familiar with the defense. On October 2, 2017, Ragland made his NFL debut and first career start in a 29-20 victory against the Washington Redskins. He made his first career tackle with teammate Frank Zombo, as they both tackled Robert Kelley to stop a three-yard run. Head coach Andy Reid stated that Ragland was started over a healthy Ramik Wilson so they could see what he had to offer. He remained the starting inside linebacker, opposite Derrick Johnson, for the remainder of the season. On November 19, 2017, Ragland made a season-high nine combined tackles in a 12-9 loss at the New York Giants. The following week, he tied his season-high of nine combined tackles during a 16-10 loss against his former team, the Buffalo Bills. Ragland was a healthy scratch for the Chiefs' Week 17 matchup at the Denver Broncos and finished the  season with 44 combined tackles (31 solo) in 12 games and ten starts.

The Kansas City Chiefs finished the 2017 season atop the AFC West with a 10-6 record and received a playoff berth. On January 6, 2018, Ragland started his first career playoff game and collected nine combined tackles in a 22-21 loss to the Tennessee Titans.

2018 season
In 2018, Ragland played in 16 games with 15 starts, finishing second on the team with 86 combined tackles, a half sack, and an interception.

2019 season
In week 7 of the 2019 season against the Denver Broncos, Ragland recorded a sack on Joe Flacco and recovered a fumble forced on Flacco by teammate Anthony Hitchens and returned it for a touchdown in the 30-6 win. Ragland helped the Chiefs win Super Bowl LIV against the San Francisco 49ers 31-20. Ragland recorded 2 tackles in the game.

Detroit Lions
On April 7, 2020, Ragland signed with the Detroit Lions.

New York Giants
On March 20, 2021, Ragland signed a one-year contract with the New York Giants.

Las Vegas Raiders
On November 10, 2022, the Las Vegas Raiders signed Ragland to their practice squad.

Cleveland Browns
On December 7, 2022, Ragland was signed off the Raiders practice squad by the Cleveland Browns.

References

External links 
 
 Alabama Crimson Tide bio

1993 births
Living people
People from Madison, Alabama
Players of American football from Alabama
American football linebackers
Alabama Crimson Tide football players
All-American college football players
Buffalo Bills players
Kansas City Chiefs players
Detroit Lions players
New York Giants players
Las Vegas Raiders players
Cleveland Browns players